Liberty Township is an inactive township in Crawford County, in the U.S. state of Missouri.

Liberty Township was named for the American principle of liberty.

References

Townships in Missouri
Townships in Crawford County, Missouri